Hanif Khan (born 5 July 1959) is a Pakistani field hockey player. He was born in Karachi. He won a Gold medal at the 1984 Summer Olympics in Los Angeles, and a Bronze medal at the 1976 Summer Olympics in Montreal.He won Gold Medal in 1978 and 1982 World Cups in Buenos Aires and Mumbai respectively.

Awards and recognition
 Pride of Performance Award by the President of Pakistan in 1984
 Sitara-i-Imtiaz award by the President of Pakistan in 2014.

References

External links

1959 births
Living people
Field hockey players from Karachi
Pakistani male field hockey players
Olympic field hockey players of Pakistan
Field hockey players at the 1976 Summer Olympics
Field hockey players at the 1984 Summer Olympics
Olympic gold medalists for Pakistan
Olympic medalists in field hockey
Recipients of Sitara-i-Imtiaz
Recipients of the Pride of Performance
Medalists at the 1976 Summer Olympics
Medalists at the 1984 Summer Olympics
Olympic bronze medalists for Pakistan
Asian Games gold medalists for Pakistan
Asian Games medalists in field hockey
Field hockey players at the 1978 Asian Games
Field hockey players at the 1982 Asian Games
Medalists at the 1978 Asian Games
Medalists at the 1982 Asian Games
1978 Men's Hockey World Cup players
20th-century Pakistani people